The 2005–06 Scottish Cup was the 121st season of Scotland's most prestigious football knockout competition, also known for sponsorship reasons as the Tennent's Scottish Cup. The Cup was won by SPL club Heart of Midlothian who defeated Second Division side Gretna on penalties after a 1–1 draw in the final. Hearts became the first non-Old Firm club to win the Cup since they themselves won it in 1997–98. Gretna earned a place in the UEFA Cup with Hearts having already qualified for the Champions League via the SPL.

A major shock occurred in the third round when First Division side Clyde defeated Cup holders Celtic 2–1. Rangers were knocked out of at the fourth round stage, losing 3–0 at home to Hibernian. East of Scotland League club Spartans reached the fourth round before eventually losing to St Mirren after a replay.

Calendar

First round

Replay

Second round

Third round

Replays

Fourth round

Replays

Quarter-finals

Replay

Semi-finals

Final

References

Scottish Cup seasons
Scottish Cup, 2005-06
Scot